Pavanatma College, Murickassery, is a general degree,  P.G college located in Murickassery, Idukki district, Kerala, established in the year 1982. The college is affiliated with Mahatma Gandhi University. This college offers different courses in arts, commerce and science.

Departments

Science

Physics
Chemistry
Mathematics
Computer Science

Arts and Commerce

Malayalam
English
Hindi
History
Economics
Physical Education
Commerce

Accreditation
The college is  recognized by the University Grants Commission (UGC).the college is accredited by naac in 2015.

References

External links
 

Universities and colleges in Idukki district
Educational institutions established in 1982
1982 establishments in Kerala
Arts and Science colleges in Kerala
Colleges affiliated to Mahatma Gandhi University, Kerala